Priestess is a live album by jazz composer, arranger, conductor and keyboardist Gil Evans recorded in 1977 and performed by Evans with an orchestra featuring David Sanborn, Arthur Blythe, Lew Soloff, and George Adams.

Reception
In 1984, this album was nominated for Grammy Award for Best Jazz Instrumental Performance, Group.

The Allmusic review by Scott Yanow awarded the album 4 stars stating "After the success of his studio sessions of the early to mid-'70s, Gil Evans primarily recorded live in concert during the remainder of his career. This is one of the better sets... the music is quite stimulating and exciting".

Track listing
 "Priestess" (Billy Harper) - 19:42   
 "Short Visit" (John Simon) - 12:07   
 "" (Masabumi Kikuchi) - 4:19   
 "Orange Was the Color of Her Dress, Then Blue Silk" (Charles Mingus) - 4:40

Personnel
Gil Evans - piano, arranger, conductor
Lew Soloff - trumpet, piccolo trumpet  
Hannibal Marvin Peterson, Ernie Royal - trumpet  
Jimmy Knepper - trombone  
John Clark - French horn  
Howard Johnson, Bob Stewart - tuba 
Arthur Blythe, David Sanborn - alto saxophone
George Adams - tenor saxophone  
Pete Levin - synthesizer, clavinet  
Keith Loving - guitar  
 - bass  
Sue Evans - drums

References 

1983 live albums
Gil Evans live albums
Albums arranged by Gil Evans
Antilles Records live albums